The historic City of Central, commonly known as Central City, is a home rule municipality located in Gilpin and Clear Creek counties, Colorado, United States. Central City is the county seat and the most populous municipality of Gilpin County. The city population was 779, all in Gilpin County, at the 2020 United States census. The city is a historic mining settlement founded in 1859 during the Pike's Peak Gold Rush and came to be known as the "Richest Square Mile on Earth". Central City and the adjacent city of Black Hawk form the federally designated Central City/Black Hawk Historic District. The city is now a part of the Denver–Aurora–Lakewood, CO Metropolitan Statistical Area and the Front Range Urban Corridor.

History

On May 6, 1859, during the Pike's Peak Gold Rush, John H. Gregory found a gold-bearing vein (the Gregory Lode) in Gregory Gulch between Black Hawk and Central City. Within two months many other veins were discovered, including the Bates, Gunnell, Kansas, and Burroughs. By 1860, as many as 10,000 prospectors had flocked to the town, then known as Mountain City, and surrounding prospects, but most soon left, many returning east. The 1900 census showed 3,114 people.

The year 1863 brought the first attempt by hard rock miners to form a hard rock miners' union. Of 125 miners signing a union resolution in Central City, about fifty broke windows and doors at the Bob Tail mine, forcing other workers out. After a night of shooting and fighting, the union effort among Central City miners failed.

Many Chinese immigrants lived in Central City during the early days working the placer deposits of Gregory Gulch. They were forbidden to work in the underground mines. Most of them are believed to have returned to China after making their stake.

The frontier gambler Poker Alice lived for a time in Central City and several other Colorado mining communities.

Gold mining in the Central City district decreased rapidly between 1900 and 1920, as the veins were exhausted. Mining revived in the early 1930s in response to the increase in the price of gold from $20 to $35 per ounce, but then virtually shut down during World War II when gold mining was declared nonessential to the war effort. The district was enlivened in the 1950s by efforts to locate uranium deposits, but these proved unsuccessful.

The population of Central City and its sister city Black Hawk fell to a few hundred by the 1950s. Casino gambling was introduced in both towns in the early 1990s, but had more success in Black Hawk (which has 18 casinos) than in Central City (which has 6 casinos), partly because the main road to Central City passed through Black Hawk, tempting gamblers to stop in Black Hawk instead. In an effort to compete, Central City completed a four-lane,  parkway from Interstate 70 to Central City, without going through Black Hawk. The highway was completed in 2004, but Black Hawk, which prior to the introduction of gambling was much smaller than Central City, continues to generate more than seven times the gambling revenue that Central City does. To compete, Central City has recently eliminated height restrictions for building on undeveloped land.

Tax from the gambling revenue provides funding for the State Historical Fund, administered by the Colorado Office of Archaeology and Historic Preservation.

Geography
Central City is located in southern Gilpin County. The city limits extend south along the Central City Parkway into Clear Creek County, as far as Interstate 70. The city is bordered by Black Hawk to the east and Idaho Springs to the south.

At the 2020 United States census, the city had a total area of  including  of water.

Demographics

As of the census of 2000, there were 515 people, 261 households, and 101 families residing in the city. The racial makeup of the city was 91.84% White, 0.19% Black or African American, 1.55% Native American, 1.17% Asian, 1.17% Pacific Islander, 2.52% from other races, and 1.55% from two or more races. 9.32% of the population were Hispanic or Latino of any race.

There were 261 households, out of which 17.6% had children under the age of 18 living with them, 26.8% were married couples living together, 8.8% had a female householder with no husband present, and 61.3% were non-families. 43.3% of all households were made up of individuals, and 6.1% had someone living alone who was 65 years of age or older. The average household size was 1.97 and the average family size was 2.76.

In the city, the population was spread out, with 16.5% under the age of 18, 10.1% from 18 to 24, 34.0% from 25 to 44, 30.9% from 45 to 64, and 8.5% who were 65 years of age or older. The median age was 39 years. For every 100 females, there were 115.5 males. For every 100 females age 18 and over, there were 115.0 males.

The median income for a household in the city was $30,921, and the median income for a family was $31,667. Males had a median income of $32,917 versus $25,446 for females. The per capita income for the city was $26,465. About 7.4% of families and 12.3% of the population were below the poverty line, including 8.3% of those under age 18 and 5.2% of those age 65 or over.

Arts and culture

 The Central City Opera House, designed by Colorado architect Robert Saur Roeschlaub, continues to host entertainment during the summer.
 The Teller House, with the painting The Face on the Barroom Floor by Herndon Davis.

Education
Central City Public Schools are part of the Gilpin County School District RE-1. The district has one elementary school and one high school, Gilpin County Elementary School and Gilpin County Undivided High School.

Infrastructure

Transportation
The Black Hawk & Central City Tramway, operated by the cities of Black Hawk and Central City, provides a free shuttle between the two towns. Ramblin Express and Ace Express Coaches provides transportation from Denver.

See also

Colorado
Bibliography of Colorado
Index of Colorado-related articles
Outline of Colorado
List of counties in Colorado
List of municipalities in Colorado
List of places in Colorado
List of statistical areas in Colorado
Front Range Urban Corridor
North Central Colorado Urban Area
Denver-Aurora, CO Combined Statistical Area
Denver-Aurora-Lakewood, CO Metropolitan Statistical Area
Central City Parkway
Pike's Peak Gold Rush

References

External links

Central City official website
CDOT map of Central City
Early Photos of Central City
Central City Boom and Bust
Main Street Central - Central City's local merchants' association
Central City Photos and Information at Western Mining History

 
Cities in Colorado
Colorado Mining Boom
County seats in Colorado
Denver metropolitan area
Gambling localities in Colorado
Cities in Gilpin County, Colorado
Cities in Clear Creek County, Colorado
1859 establishments in Kansas Territory